G55 may refer to
 Fiat G.55 Centauro, a World War II fighter aircraft
 G55 Erenhot–Guangzhou Expressway in China
 HMS Lightning (G55), a World War II destroyer of the Royal Navy
Ginetta G55, a British racing car.